Extinct is a post-apocalyptic science fiction television series directed by Ryan Little and written by Orson Scott Card and Aaron Johnston. The series was picked up by BYUtv for ten episodes and premiered October 1, 2017. It is the network's second scripted television series, the first being Granite Flats.

The project was originally written to be made into a film, but BYUtv producer Adam Abel was interested in making it into a television series, and Card and Johnston re-wrote the scripts to comply with the formats.

The series was cancelled after one season.

Premise
The series takes place 400 years after the human race has been exterminated by aliens. It follows Ezra, Abram, and Feena who have been revived by an alien faction for the purposes of restarting human civilization. The group cultivates their relationship with the alien restorers while dealing with conflicts from those genocidal aliens which destroyed humanity.

Cast

Main
Chad Michael Collins as Ezra
Victoria Atkin as Feena
Jaclyn Hales as Lynn
Yorke Fryer as Abram
Jack Depew as Silas
Matthew Bellows as Jax
Jake Stormoen as Duncan
Kirby Heyborne as voice of Red Drone
Anna Vocino as voice of Yellow Drone

Recurring
Eliza de Azevedo Brown as Young Kylie
Bailee Michelle Johnson as Adult Kylie
Shayla McCafferey as "Forest Girl" Raven (aka Squirrel Girl)
Anna Sward Hansen as Old Eleanor
Aaron Johnston as voice of Blue Drone
Nic Luken as Nicholas

Guest stars
Cosette Shaha as Baby Kylie (episode: "Pilot") 
Jocelyn Jay Black as Toddler Kylie (episode: "Pilot") 
Joshua French as Convenience Store Clerk (episode: "Pilot") 
Jake Van Wagoner as Newscaster (episode: "Pilot") 
Denise Dorado as Althea (episode: "Broken") 
Champagne Powell as Old Abram (episode: "Broken") 
Melanie Stone as Rowen (episode: "Death Did Us Part")

Production and filming
The show was filmed in Utah. Zion National Park, The Salt Flats, St. George, Kanab, Payson and Fillmore were used as locations. The main set in the LDS Motion Picture Studio in Provo was also used.

Episodes
The first two episodes premiered commercial free on BYUtv October 1, 2017. Episodes 3–8 were made available to stream on byutv.org and at extinct.tv that same night. Episodes 9 and 10 were released online when they were shown as a 2-hour finale on BYUtv on November 19, 2017.

Cancellation 
The series was cancelled after one season. In an interview Card attributed the cancellation of the show to new management at BYUtv, stating that despite positive reception, "it didn't grow in their own garden, so they didn't want it."

Reception
Post Apocalyptic Media's Derek Dwilson called season 1's finale "impressive" and said "Extinct deserves to be renewed." Paste Magazine says the first season is "worth paying attention to," despite spurning BYUtv's claims that the show is family friendly. Abby White says "the show features mass grave sites, killer viruses and highly aggressive bad guys who want the heroes dead. It’s not necessarily for the faint of heart, and yet the way it’s shot, edited and written makes it quite arguably a lot tamer than most sci-fi TV."

Deseret News received the pilot positively writing "this pilot...making for uneven pacing at times, but intriguing backstories and a suspenseful ending leave many questions that will most likely be explored in future episodes, creating a thought provoking sci-fi show."

References

External links
 

2017 American television series debuts
2010s American science fiction television series
American action adventure television series
2010s American drama television series
Television series about extraterrestrial life
Post-apocalyptic television series
BYU TV original programming